"Over in Hero-Land" is a World War I era song released in 1918. Arthur Freed wrote the lyrics. Louis Silvers composed the music. Meyer Cohen Music of New York, New York published the song. It was written for voice and piano. The cover was designed by E. Pfeiffer. It features a drawing of a tank firing at soldiers. Below it is a picture of Lola Wentworth, who performed the song.

The song chronicles the departure of a soldier from his significant other. The woman is full of heartache, but is also proud of "her soldier boy." In order to comfort herself she repeats a prayer, which is the chorus:

The sheet music can be found at the Library of Congress and Pritzker Military Museum & Library.

References

1918 songs
Songs of World War I
Songs with lyrics by Arthur Freed
Songs with music by Louis Silvers